Bjørn Sigmund Gulbrandsen (9 January 1927 – 20 May 1988) was a Norwegian ice hockey player. He was born in Oslo, Norway and represented the club Vålerengens IF. He played for the Norwegian national ice hockey team, and  participated at the Winter Olympics in 1952, where the Norwegian team placed 9th.

References

1927 births
1988 deaths
Ice hockey players at the 1952 Winter Olympics
Norwegian ice hockey players
Olympic ice hockey players of Norway
Ice hockey people from Oslo